William Buchanan (March 6, 1830 – January 20, 1910) was an American mechanical engineer. He also designed and improved freight locomotives for hauling heavy commercial freight. He was an authority on mechanical engineering in America and Europe and was elected to membership of the Institute of Civil Engineers of London.

Early life 
William Buchanan was born in Dumbarton, Scotland, on March 6, 1830. He came to America with his parents when he was a child. Buchanan's father was a mechanic and blacksmith and he followed in his father's footsteps. In his early teens, he learned blacksmithing and machining at the Burden Iron Works at Troy, New York. In 1847, he became employed at the Albany and Schenectady Railroad as an apprentice in the machine shops of the company at Albany, New York. Early in his career he did mechanical work on the DeWitt Clinton locomotive.

Buchanan came to New York City in September 1849, where he worked as a machinist in the machine shops of the Hudson River Railroad until July 1851 when he ran a locomotive as an engineer on the New York City line until December. He was then promoted to shop foreman at the beginning of 1852, and in June 1853 master mechanic of the Southern Division of the Hudson River Railroad, which had headquarters in New York City.

Mid life and career 
Buchanan was given responsibility for the locomotive power of the Hudson River Railroad and the Troy and Greenfield Railroad in 1859 with the New York and Harlem Railroad added to his responsibilities in 1880. In 1881 Buchanan was placed in charge of the locomotive power of the New York Central and Hudson River Railroad before being promoted in 1885 to the superintendent position of locomotive power and vehicle rolling stock. The West Shore Railroad was leased to New York Central Railroad in 1886 and at that time Buchanan was given the responsibilities of managing the locomotive engines and passenger cars in addition to his existing duties.

Buchanan made many improvements in locomotives from the West Albany machine shops and in recognition of his work was elected a member of the Institution of Civil Engineers of London in 1891.

After a high-speed locomotive was proposed by New York Central and Hudson River Railroad executives to pull the Empire State Express, their premier express train to the 1893 Chicago's World's Fair. Buchanan designed the New York Central and Hudson River Railroad locomotive No. 999 engine at the West Albany shops in February 1893 with the aim to be the first locomotive to  The locomotive was constructed between March and April 1893 and had the wheel configuration of a standard American locomotive - four leading wheels, four driving wheels, and no trailing wheels (4-4-0). The locomotive was given the number 999 because it was thought to be a number that would impress the public. The locomotive pulled the New York state express train of vehicles on a test run from Rochester, New York, to Buffalo, New York on May 9, 1893. 

As well as his work on the 999 locomotive, Buchanan redesigned and improved existing locomotives for heavy duty freight with many of his designs for enormous train locomotives adopted by other railroad companies.

Later life and death 

Buchanan retired from the railroad business in 1899 after working for the New York Central since 1847. He died at his home at South Norwalk, Connecticut, on January 20, 1910.

References

Sources 

 
 

1830 births
1910 deaths
19th-century inventors
19th-century American engineers
19th-century American people
Businesspeople from New York City
People from Dumbarton
Scottish emigrants to the United States